The montane brown frog or Nikkō frog (Rana ornativentris) is a species of frog in the family Ranidae. It is endemic to Japan.

Its natural habitats are subtropical or tropical dry forests, rivers, swamps, freshwater marshes, arable land, irrigated land, and seasonally flooded agricultural land.

References

Endemic amphibians of Japan
Rana (genus)
Taxonomy articles created by Polbot
Amphibians described in 1903